Radlein is a surname. Notable people with the surname include:

Julian Radlein (born 1981), Canadian football player
Sharlene Rädlein (born 1990), Jamaican model and beauty pageant winner